Sachse High School is a public high school located in Sachse, Texas (USA). Sachse High School enrolls students in grades 9-12 and is a part of the Garland Independent School District. The first graduating class was the Charter Class of 2005.

In 2009, the school was rated "recognized" by the Texas Education Agency.

Statistics (per 2009)
The attendance rate for students at the school is 96%, equal to the state average of 96%. 25% of the students at Sachse are economically disadvantaged, 10% enroll in special education, 6% enroll in gifted and talent programs, 39% are enrolled in career and technology programs, and 7% are considered "limited English proficient."

The ethnic makeup of the school is 50% White, non-Hispanic, 27% Hispanic, 16% African American, 7% Asian/Pacific Islander, and less than 1% Native American.

The average class sizes at Sachse are 24 students for English, 24 for foreign language, 25 for math, 23 for science, and 27 for social studies.

Teachers at the school carry, on average, 9 years of teaching experience and 6% of the teachers on staff are first-year teachers.

In 2011 Sachse High School made it to the state playoffs for football for the first time in the school's history.

Feeder patterns
Garland ISD is a Free Choice school district, which allows the parent to choose which school his or her children want to attend within the district.

Sports
Sachse High School has a strong athletic department, and offers its students the following sports: Baseball, Basketball, Cross Country, Football, Golf, Powerlifting, Soccer, Softball, Tennis, Track, and Volleyball. Sachse was put into the UIL Class 5A for the 2013-2014 school year, but will be moved to the UIL Class 6A Region 2 District 11 for the 2014-2015 school year and onwards.

Fine Arts
Sachse High school has a fine arts program with Band, Choir, and Theater

Extracurricular
Two Sachse High School students won the 2014 HOSA National Championship for Community Emergency Response Team (CERT)Skills.

Notable alumni
Devine Ozigbo - Football player for the New England Patriots.
Devin Duvernay - Football player for the Baltimore Ravens.
Jared Mayden - Football player for the San Francisco 49ers.

See also
Garland Independent School District
Garland, Texas
List of high schools in Texas

References

External links

Garland Independent School District
Sachse High School Band
Sachse Swingsters Drill Team

Garland Independent School District high schools
2002 establishments in Texas
Educational institutions established in 2002